Rossendale was a parliamentary constituency in the Lancashire, England. Created in 1885, it elected one Member of Parliament (MP) to the House of Commons of the Parliament of the United Kingdom, elected by the first-past-the-post voting system. When created it comprised the districts of Rawtenstall, Bacup, and Haslingden; Ramsbottom district was added to the constituency in 1950.

The constituency ceased to exist with the implementation of the 1983 boundary changes and was replaced by the Rossendale and Darwen constituency. The exact nature of the changes were as follows: 9,882 electors of the Rossendale seat were transferred to Bury North. 25,918 electors were added from the abolished Darwen constituency and 5,267 from Heywood and Royton.

Boundaries
1885–1918: The Sessional Division of Rossendale, and part of the Borough of Bacup.

1918–1950: The Boroughs of Bacup, Haslingden, and Rawtenstall.

1950–1983: The Boroughs of Bacup, Haslingden, and Rawtenstall, and the Urban District of Ramsbottom.

Members of Parliament

Elections

Elections in the 1880s

Elections in the 1890s 
Cavendish succeeded to the peerage, becoming Duke of Devonshire and causing a by-election.

Elections in the 1900s

Elections in the 1910s 

General Election 1914–15:
Another General Election was required to take place before the end of 1915. The political parties had been making preparations for an election to take place and by the July 1914, the following candidates had been selected; 
Liberal: Lewis Harcourt
Unionist:

Elections in the 1920s 

Furness Dean was Liberal candidate but withdrew at the last minute for health reasons.

Elections in the 1930s 

General Election 1939–40:
Another General Election was required to take place before the end of 1940. The political parties had been making preparations for an election to take place and by the Autumn of 1939, the following candidates had been selected; 
Conservative: Ronald Cross
Labour: George Walker

Election in the 1940s

Elections in the 1950s

Elections in the 1960s

Elections in the 1970s

See also
Rossendale and Darwen Parliamentary constituency

References

Election results, 1950 - 1979

Parliamentary constituencies in North West England (historic)
Constituencies of the Parliament of the United Kingdom established in 1885
Constituencies of the Parliament of the United Kingdom disestablished in 1983
Borough of Rossendale